Waimairi Beach is a suburb of Christchurch, New Zealand. It is located north east of the city. It is east of Parklands and north of North New Brighton. The word "waimairi" translates to "listless stream". 

One of the main roads through the suburb is Aston Drive. This was originally Vogel Street, named after Prime Minister Julius Vogel (1835–1899) and renamed to Aston Street in 1848 after local landowner Sidney John Aston (1886–1946) and then to Aston Drive in 1995.

The area was part of Waimairi County until 1982, when the county was renamed to Waimairi District. The district was amalgamated into the Christchurch City Council in 1989 as part of the 1989 New Zealand local government reforms.

Demographics

Waimairi Beach had a population of 1,308 at the 2018 New Zealand census, an increase of 42 people (3.3%) since the 2013 census, and an increase of 246 people (23.2%) since the 2006 census. There were 471 households. There were 624 males and 684 females, giving a sex ratio of 0.91 males per female. The median age was 43.8 years (compared with 37.4 years nationally), with 279 people (21.3%) aged under 15 years, 165 (12.6%) aged 15 to 29, 669 (51.1%) aged 30 to 64, and 195 (14.9%) aged 65 or older.

Ethnicities were 95.9% European/Pākehā, 8.7% Māori, 2.5% Pacific peoples, 1.6% Asian, and 1.4% other ethnicities (totals add to more than 100% since people could identify with multiple ethnicities).

The proportion of people born overseas was 22.7%, compared with 27.1% nationally.

Although some people objected to giving their religion, 51.6% had no religion, 39.4% were Christian, 0.2% were Hindu, 0.2% were Buddhist and 1.6% had other religions.

Of those at least 15 years old, 285 (27.7%) people had a bachelor or higher degree, and 108 (10.5%) people had no formal qualifications. The median income was $44,900, compared with $31,800 nationally. The employment status of those at least 15 was that 546 (53.1%) people were employed full-time, 192 (18.7%) were part-time, and 36 (3.5%) were unemployed.

References 

Suburbs of Christchurch